The Shire of Kulin is a local government area in the eastern Wheatbelt region of Western Australia, about  ESE of the state capital, Perth. The Shire's land area of  forms a narrow east-west band, located between the Shire of Kondinin to the north and the Shire of Lake Grace to the south. Its seat of government is the town of Kulin. The local economy is based on agriculture - predominantly cereal grains and sheep.

History
On 14 June 1918, the Roe Road District was gazetted. It was renamed to the Kulin Road District on 12 March 1926. On 1 July 1961, it became a shire under the Local Government Act 1960.

Wards
The shire is divided into 4 wards.

 Town Ward (3 councillors)
 West Ward (3 councillors)
 Central Ward (2 councillors)
 East Ward (1 councillor)

From 1964 until 3 May 2003, the following system existed:

 Town Ward
 Central Ward
 Dudinin Ward
 East Ward
 Jitarning Ward
 Kulin Rock Ward

Towns and localities
The towns and localities of the Shire of Kulin with population and size figures based on the most recent Australian census:

Population

Heritage-listed places
As of 2023, 140 places are heritage-listed in the Shire of Kulin, of which two are on the State Register of Heritage Places.

References

External links
 

Kulin